The 2017 NCAA Division I Field Hockey Championship is the 37th annual tournament organized by the NCAA, to determine the national champion of Division I women's college field hockey in the United States. 

The semifinals and championship match will be played at Trager Stadium at the University of Louisville in Louisville, Kentucky from November 17 to 19, 2017.

Qualified teams

 A total of 18 teams qualified for the 2017 tournament, the same number of teams as 2016. 10 teams received automatic bids by winning their conference tournaments and an additional 8 teams earned at-large bids based on their regular season records.

Automatic qualifiers

At-large qualifiers

Bracket

See also 
NCAA Division II Field Hockey Championship
NCAA Division III Field Hockey Championship

References 

2017
Field Hockey
2017 in women's field hockey
2017 in sports in Kentucky